Clovis Ewing Stark (October 6, 1914 – April 25, 2001) was an American professional basketball player. He played in the National Basketball League for the Dayton Metropolitans in nine games during the 1937–38 season and averaged 4.2 points per game.

References

1914 births
2001 deaths
American men's basketball players
Basketball players from Ohio
Dayton Metropolitans players
Forwards (basketball)
Ohio Wesleyan Battling Bishops men's basketball players